With You, Without You is a 2012 Sri Lankan film written and directed by prolific Sri Lankan filmmaker Prasanna Vithanage, and produced by Lasantha Navaratne, Mohammad Adamaly and Prasanna Vithanage for Akar Films. It stars Shyam Fernando and Anjali Patil in lead roles with Maheshwari Ratnam and Wasantha Moragoda. Music composed by Lakshman Joseph De Saram.

Based on the 1876 short story "A Gentle Creature" by Fyodor Dostoyevski, Oba Nathuwa Oba Ekka was adapted into a post-war Sri Lankan background. Principal photography was shot in Bogawanthalawa, Central Province, Sri Lanka and Sarasavi Studio in Colombo.

Synopsis
Sarathsiri, a man in his mid-forties, runs a pawn shop from his two-storied building in a remote town surrounded by tea plantations. He broods, rarely talks, and in his spare time intently watches professional wrestling on TV.

One day, Selvi, a young woman, lands at his pawn shop with a fistful of worthless trinkets and keeps coming back. Sarathsiri is intrigued by her and through his maid Lakshmi finds out that Selvi, a Tamil Christian is originally from Kilinochchi, an ethnic civil war stricken area of northern Sri Lanka. Her parents have sent her to this up country area of central Sri Lanka to save her life. Sarathsri gets to know that an older widowed businessman has asked for Selvi's hand in marriage and immediately rushes in to declare his own desire to marry her. She accepts and they get married.

Once at home, Sarathsiri teaches her the basics of pawning business and tells her of his dream to own a tea plantation. However, he remains aloof, cold and unresponsive to Selvi who it seems is blossoming after the marriage. One day they go to see a South Indian Tamil movie at a local theatre. Selvi who has never seen a movie on a big screen is visibly happy. Sarathsiri, however, is his dour self and says it was a waste of money. While Selvi exudes a warmth and happiness, Sarathsri remains engrossed in his pawnshop and the wrestling bouts on TV.

One day out of the blue, an old friend of Sarathsri appears at his door. Sarathsri drags his friend out for a drink, they return late at night drunk, and have an argument. In the morning while Sarathsiri is asleep Selvi goes downstairs to answer a knock on the door. Gamini (the friend) is awake and asks Selvi to forgive him for barging in unannounced. Selvi discovers through Gamini that Sarathsiri is an ex Sri Lankan army soldier.

Shocked, Selvi leaves the house. Sarathsri goes looking for her and finds her at the same bus stop where he had proposed. At night Selvi confronts Sarathsiri and asks him why he hid from her his army past. Dissatisfied with his monosyllabic replies, Selvi  says if she knew he had served in the army, she would have never married him. She tells him about her two brothers who were killed by the Sri Lankan army. She informs him that her parents brought her here to save her from being raped by the Sri Lankan army soldiers. Unsettled by her ferocity, Sarathsiri grabs his pillow and blanket and goes downstairs. As he is leaving the upper floor Selvi follows him asking how many Tamil women has he raped and how much gold has he stolen from them. Sarathsiri retorts saying if it wasn't for him, she would be starving.

While rummaging through the closet, Selvi discovers a handgun in a hidden drawer. At night while Sarathsiri is asleep, she creeps downstairs and points the gun at his forehead.

Next day when she opens the hidden drawer, to her surprise the revolver is missing. She feels that Sarathsiri is watching her. Selvi gradually becomes unresponsive and slips into a depression. With her health failing, Selvi's body is wracked with seizures.

Sarathsiri silently watches her withering away. One day he finds Selvi singing to herself. It dawns on Sarathsri that he may lose Selvi. He falls on his knees and confesses to her, pleads with her to speak. He promises to change, be more responsive and begs her to give their relationship one more chance. He offers to go and find her missing parents. On hearing that, Selvi goes into a seizure.

Sarathsiri becomes caring and nurturing. He feeds her, looks after her, and talks to her. He confesses that as a soldier he gave false witness to protect his fellow soldiers including Gamini after they were accused of raping and killing a Tamil girl. He tells her that he left the army because he couldn't come to terms with his lie. His confession makes her condition worse as she goes into a deep seizure.

In a desperate effort to get her back, Sarathsiri sells his business and offers to take her to India and show her films. One morning Selvi unexpectedly apologises to Sarathsiri about not being the wife he desired and promises to make amends. Overjoyed, Sarathsiri kisses her from head to toe and leaves to buy air tickets for India. Selvi picks up the rosary and prays. Selvi is at peace. She has made her decision.

Cast
 Shyam Fernando as Sarathsiri
 Anjali Patil as Selvi
 Maheshwari Ratnam as Lakshmi
 Wasantha Moragoda as Gamini

Music
The original music for Oba Nathuwa Oba Ekka was composed by Lakshman Joseph De Saram.

Editing
Editing was done in Chennai, India. Renowned editor A. Sreekar Prasad who edited three of Prasanna Vithanage movies (Purahanda Kaluwara, Ira Madiyama, Akasa Kusum) did the editing for Oba Nathuwa Oba Ekka.

Sound designing
Sound designer was Tapas Nayak whose previous work include Raavan and Paa.

Cinematography
Veteran photographer M.D. Mahindapala joined Prasanna Vithanage for the fifth consecutive time to work as the cinematographer in Oba Nathuwa Oba Ekka.

Prasanna Vithanage and M.D. Mahindapala collaborations:
 Anantha Rathriya
 Purahanda Kaluwara
 Ira Madiyama
 Akasa Kusum

Production
The script was completed in September 2011 and pre-production started in December 2011. Principal photography was done from February to March 2012. Post-production started in April 2012. The movie was completed in July 2012. Oba Nathuwa Oba Ekka is a co-production between Sri Lanka and Aakar productions India.

Producers
Lasantha Nawarathna and Mohamed Adamaly produced the movie.

Screened film festivals
 Montreal Film Festival – Canada
 Fukuoka Film Festival – Japan
 BFI London Film Festival – London
 Indian Film festival – Goa
 Chennai International Film Festival – Chennai, India
 Vesoul Film Festival – France
 Dublin International Film Festival – Ireland
 Hong Kong International Film Festival - Hong Kong
 Milano African Asian Film Festival
 Moscow International Film Festival
 Kerala International Film Festival
 Pune International Film Festival

Awards
 SIGNIS Award Milano African Asian Film Festival 2013
 BEST FILM Cyclod’or Vesoul Asian Film Festival 2013
 NETPAC AWARD - Vesoul International Film Festival of Asian Cinema 2013
 BEST ACTRESS - International Film Festival of India 2012

References

External links
 
 Oba Nathuwa Oba Ekka (With You, Without You) on Fukuoka International Film Festival 
 Oba Nathuwa Oba Ekka Montreal World Film Festival (World Greats section selection)
 Ceylontoday.lk
 Dailynews.lk
 Sindaytimes.lk
 Asiantribune.com
 Therepublicsquare.com
 Guardian.co.uk
 Whatson.bfi.org.uk
 Sundaytimes.lk
 Hindustantimes.com
 Variety.com
 Ica.org.uk
 Timeout.com

2012 films
2010s Tamil-language films
Sinhala-language films
Films based on works by Fyodor Dostoyevsky
Films based on short fiction
Films directed by Prasanna Vithanage
Films produced by Prasanna Vithanage
Films with screenplays by Prasanna Vithanage